Delbert Quentin Wilber (February 24, 1919 – July 18, 2002), was an American professional baseball player, manager, coach and scout. A catcher, he appeared in 299 Major League games for the St. Louis Cardinals (1946–49), Philadelphia Phillies (1951–52) and Boston Red Sox (1952–54). The native of Lincoln Park, Michigan, threw and batted right-handed.

Catcher with three MLB clubs
Wilber signed with the American League St. Louis Browns in 1938, but was acquired by the Cardinals in 1940 and played in their extensive farm system until the outbreak of World War II; he missed the 1942–45 seasons while serving in the United States Army Air Force, where he attained the rank of captain. In , he resumed his baseball career and made his Major League debut, appearing in four games before being sent to the Triple-A Columbus Red Birds. He did not appear in the 1946 World Series.

Wilber played in 51 games for the 1947 Cardinals and 27 more in 1948, but did not spend a full season in MLB again until , when he appeared in 84 games, 61 as the starting catcher, for the Phillies.  After only two games played for the  Phillies, Wilber's contract was purchased by the Red Sox on May 12. He served for three seasons as the Red Sox' second-string and third-string receiver behind Sammy White, through 1954.  Boston then traded him to the New York Giants for infielder Billy Klaus that December, but the Giants granted Wilber his release to enable him to join the coaching staff of the Chicago White Sox for the  season.

On August 27, 1951, Wilber hit three home runs off pitcher Ken Raffensberger, each on the first pitch of each at bat, to lead the Phillies to a 3–0 victory over the Cincinnati Reds. Two years later, while playing for the Red Sox, Wilber had 27 hits and 29 runs batted in, making him one of the few big leaguers to have more RBIs than hits in a season.

In all or parts of eight MLB seasons, Wilber compiled 720 at bats, 67 runs, 174 hits, 35 doubles, seven triples, 19 homers, 115 RBI, one stolen base and 44 bases on balls. He batted .242 with an on-base percentage of .286, a slugging percentage of .389, 280 total bases and five sacrifice hits.

According to The Sporting News' Official Baseball Register, Wilber had a unique hobby during his catching career. When a pitcher hurled an especially noteworthy game, Wilber would decorate a game baseball, writing the line score of the contest, as well as game highlights, on the ball, then present it to his pitcher.

Manager, scout and coach
Wilber managed in minor league baseball both during his playing career and after it ended. He led the Cardinals' Houston Buffaloes Double-A farm club as a catcher-manager in 1949. Then, after hanging up his catching gear, he managed at the Triple-A level with the Louisville Colonels, Houston Buffs of the American Association, Charleston Senators, Tacoma Twins, Denver Bears and Spokane Indians. He skippered affiliates of the Baltimore Orioles, both the original and expansion editions of the Washington Senators, and the Senators' current incarnations as the Minnesota Twins and Texas Rangers.

His one-game stint as skipper of the 1973 Texas Rangers—as interim pilot between Whitey Herzog and Billy Martin on September 7, he won his only game as manager, 10–8 against the future world champion Oakland Athletics—occurred after Wilber led the Rangers' Spokane affiliate to the 1973 championship of the Pacific Coast League, one of three league titles in his minor-league resume. Wilber was a coach for the 1955–56 White Sox and the 1970 Senators, serving under former teammates Marty Marion and Ted Williams. He also scouted for the Orioles, Twins, Athletics, Cincinnati Reds and Detroit Tigers. He died in St. Petersburg, Florida at the age of 83.

Wilber's son, Rick, is a writer, editor, and teacher. His two other sons, Del Wilber Jr. (Philadelphia Phillies) and Bob Wilber (Detroit Tigers and Oakland A's) both played professional minor league baseball and Bob Wilber followed in his father's footsteps as a scout (Toronto Blue Jays) after his playing days. His grandson Del Quentin Wilber is a journalist.

References

 Wilber, Rick. My Father's Game. McFarland, 2008. .

External links

1919 births
2002 deaths
Baltimore Orioles scouts
Baseball players from Michigan
Boston Red Sox players
Chicago White Sox coaches
Cincinnati Reds scouts
Columbus Red Birds players
Detroit Tigers scouts
Findlay Browns players
Findlay Oilers players
Houston Buffaloes managers
Houston Buffaloes players
Louisville Colonels (minor league) managers
Louisville Colonels (minor league) players
Major League Baseball bullpen coaches
Major League Baseball catchers
Minnesota Twins scouts
Oakland Athletics scouts
People from Lincoln Park, Michigan
Philadelphia Phillies players
Rochester Red Wings players
St. Louis Cardinals players
Spokane Indians managers
Springfield Cardinals players
Washington Senators (1961–1971) coaches